

Wallerberdina is a locality in the Australian state of South Australia located about  north of the state capital of Adelaide and about  west of the town of Hawker.

It is located on the plain between Lake Torrens in the west and the Flinders Ranges in the east.  Its boundaries approximate those of the cadastral unit of the Hundred of Warrakimbo.

The traditional owners of the area are the Banggarla peoples.

The 2016 Australian census which was conducted in August 2016 reports that Wallerberdina and two adjoining localities had no people living within the boundaries of the geographic classification known as the State Suburb of Wallerberdina.

Wallerberdina is located within the federal division of Grey, the state electoral district of Giles, the Pastoral Unincorporated Area of South Australia and the state government region of the Far North.

Mount Eyre
The site of the  government town of Mount Eyre is located at the south end of the locality on the north-west side of  the route of the Marree railway line.  It was surveyed during  January 1863 and the land sale began on 14 May 1863.  Its name is derived from Mount Eyre which was "the northernmost point of Eyre's 1839 expedition and named by Governor Gawler on 11 July 1839."

References

Notes

Citations

Towns in South Australia
Far North (South Australia)
Places in the unincorporated areas of South Australia